The Mount Laurel doctrine is a significant judicial doctrine of the New Jersey State Constitution. The doctrine requires that municipalities use their zoning powers in an affirmative manner to provide a realistic opportunity for the production of housing affordable to low- and moderate-income households.

The doctrine takes its name from the lead case in which it was first pronounced by the New Jersey Supreme Court in 1975: Southern Burlington County N.A.A.C.P. v. Mount Laurel Township (commonly called Mount Laurel I), in which the plaintiffs challenged the zoning ordinance of Mount Laurel Township, New Jersey, on the grounds that it operated to exclude low and moderate income persons from obtaining housing in the municipality.

History

Initial development

Ethel Lawrence, a sixth-generation resident of Mt. Laurel Township, was the lead plaintiff in the original Mt. Laurel case after officials in Mt. Laurel Township declared their intention of condemning and tearing down the low-income housing in her community. With no realistic alternative other than moving to the slums of Camden or Philadelphia, many residents grew increasingly concerned about the rising pressure to leave. Lawrence contacted Carl S. Bisgaier, director of Camden Regional Legal Services who, together with attorneys Kenneth E. Meiser, Thomas J. Oravetz and Peter J. O'Connor, filed the lawsuit commonly known as Mt. Laurel I. After the decision in Mount Laurel I, suits were filed against numerous municipalities. The plaintiffs in such suits fell into three classes: lower income persons who actually sought housing and advocacy organizations on their behalf; the New Jersey Public Advocate; and builders who sought to construct developments containing affordable housing.

These early exclusionary zoning suits were beset by numerous difficulties and little, if any, affordable housing resulted. In 1983 appeals in several of these cases (of which Southern Burlington County N.A.A.C.P. v. Mount Laurel Township was again the lead case), gave the New Jersey Supreme Court the opportunity to reaffirm and tweak the Mount Laurel Doctrine and provide several mechanisms and remedies to make the doctrine more effective.

1980s legislative reaction

The New Jersey Supreme Court was aware that the Mount Laurel II decision would be controversial and would engender debate about the proper role of the courts. The opinion invited legislative action to implement what the court defined as the constitutional obligation.

In 1985 the New Jersey Legislature responded by passing the Fair Housing Act. Accepting the premise that there was some constitutional obligation for municipalities to foster some degree of affordable housing, this legislation created an administrative agency, the Council on Affordable Housing (COAH), to establish regulations whereby the obligation of each municipality in terms of the number of units and how the obligation could be satisfied.

A municipality which elected to participate in COAH's administrative process prior to being sued was provided with protection from litigation and especially the builder's remedy. As a transitional provision, the act provided that municipalities involved in litigation when the act was passed were to be able to transfer the litigation to COAH unless manifest injustice would result.

COAH developed regulations under which the specific number of affordable units that each municipality would be required to provide (its "pre-credited need") could be determined. Participating municipalities developed compliance plans to address this need by such means as the application of credits (e.g. filtering, spontaneous rehabilitation, extra credit for rental units), the use of regional contribution agreements (transferring part of the obligation to a willing municipality, usually an urban center, in the same region along with payment in an amount agreed by the municipalities) and zoning for affordable housing (usually involving increased density and mandatory set-asides). When COAH approved a municipality's compliance plan it would grant "substantive certification" which was designed to provide the municipality with protection from exclusionary zoning litigation.

From the municipal point of view, the advantages of COAH's administrative process included the use of a formula to calculate fair share that might produce a lower obligation than the court would impose, the availability of the regional contribution agreement to reduce the number of units and the ability to determine where in the municipality that affordable housing ought to be developed rather than being forced to permit a development as a reward to a successful builder-plaintiff. Those municipalities that chose not to participate in COAH's administrative process remained vulnerable to exclusionary zoning lawsuits and the prospect of the builder's remedy. The disadvantage would be that a participating municipality might be required to zone some land in a manner that extra housing would be produced. Some municipalities, believing that the likelihood of facing an actual exclusionary zoning lawsuit was low enough, took their chances in not participating.

Criticism of the decision
While the Mount Laurel decision mandates a state constitutional obligation for every municipality in a "growth area" to provide a fair share of its region's present and prospective housing needs for low and moderate income families, there is no funding source specified for low or very-low income families, in a state that already has some of the nation's highest property taxes.  Some have accused the decision for being an example of judicial activism.

1980s judicial response to the Fair Housing Act

The New Jersey Supreme Court welcomed the legislature's adoption of the Fair Housing Act. A number of trial court decisions had denied transfer of pending cases to COAH under the manifest injustice standard, but the Supreme Court read that term very narrowly and ordered the cases transferred. The trial courts were directed to conform their rulings with regard to calculation of each municipality's obligation and how to meet it to COAH's regulations and the statute was found facially constitutional and interpreted to grant COAH ample authority, such as restraining the use of scarce resources (sewer capacity, potable water, land) for other than providing affordable housing, to assure that affordable housing might actually be built.

The Council on Affordable Housing (COAH)

COAH is a currently defunct government agency created in the 1980s to administer Mt. Laurel requirements. Some have argued it needs reinvigoration.

The Fair Share Housing Center
The Fair Share Housing Center, or FSHC, is a Cherry Hill-based nonprofit organization founded in 1975 that litigates against towns in enforcement of fair housing development.

Builder's remedy lawsuits
A "builder's remedy lawsuit" is a New Jersey lawsuit filed by a real estate developer in an attempt to force a New Jersey town to allow the construction of a large, multi-family housing complex that includes some affordable housing alongside ordinary apartments

Usually, the developer's court papers will make specific mention of the Mt. Laurel doctrine, which holds municipalities responsible for providing affordable housing to low and moderate income households. Some have argued that developers exploit the Mount Laurel doctrine with the builder's remedy and prevent town efforts to combat overdevelopment and sprawl. Some recent "builder's remedy" lawsuits or related concerns include:

Annandale.
Bridgewater.
Cranford.  The developers Samuel and Peter Hekemian sued the Township of Cranford to allow a mass-density development. One Cranford local opined that the builder's remedy "takes the power from our township engineers, public safety officials, board of education members and budget offices and gives it to the S. Hekemian Group, a Paramus-based builder of apartment complexes. And there is nothing anyone can do about it. It is a court order based on what they refer to as builder remedy litigation. Apparently, progress is only found in concrete."
Emerson. Local officials expressed concerns over impact of Mount Laurel on development of a 19-acre patch of woods that town officials have been trying to turn into a park.
Livingston. Despite the efforts of the Livingston-Short Hills Coalition, affiliates of the Kushner Companies filed an affordable housing suit to build developments in the town.
Millburn.  Residents of Millburn, New Jersey objected to a proposed land development by Canoe Brook, which would create a 250-room hotel, 200 residential units and a multi-deck parking structure adjacent to the Mall at Short Hills.
Montvale. The S. Hekemian Group filed to intervene in Montvale's affordable-housing litigation to build 1,000 units, arguing the borough "is in violation of its constitutional duty to create sufficient realistic opportunities" for affordable housing. In June 2017, Mayor Mike Ghassali stated, "Now we are on a path to spend untold amounts of time, money and borough resources to defend our town from a monstrous development that would change our community forever" regarding the lawsuit.
New Milford.  Despite objections from a community group, "Stop Overdevelopment New Milford", the developer S.Hekemian Group (SHG), led by Robert S. Hekemian and Peter Hekemian, brought a Mount Laurel builder's remedy suit against New Milford, New Jersey.  "I certainly do feel I have a gun to my head" said New Milford's mayor, Ann Subrizi at the close of 2016.  The township ultimately settled, causing development of one of the last undeveloped tracts of land in the area.
West Orange.  The Fair Share Housing Center, and Garden Homes, an affiliate of the Wilf family, owners of the Minnesota Vikings, have brought legal action to create more affordable housing units in West Orange, New Jersey.

Regional Contribution Agreements (RCAs)

In 1985, the Fair Housing Act created the now-repealed Regional Contribution Agreement system.  The RCAs meant that towns could pay to get out of up to half of their affordable housing obligation by funding affordable housing elsewhere as required by the New Jersey Supreme Court's Mt. Laurel decision.

In 2008, at the behest of the Fair Share Housing Center's Peter O' Connor and over the objections of some suburban Democrats, Governor Corzine signed a law barring RCAs. A500. He signed A-500 into law during a ceremony at Fair Share Housing Development's Ethel R. Lawrence Homes. Some have demanded that RCAs be returned to cut down on sprawl.

Environmental concerns

In 1983, the NJ Supreme Court cautioned that, in requiring affordable housing, our State Constitution "does not require bad planning.  It does not require suburban spread.  It does not require rural municipalities to encourage large scale housing developments.  It does not require wasteful extension of roads and needless construction of sewer and water facilities for the out-migration of people from the cities and the suburbs.  There is nothing in our Constitution that says that we cannot satisfy our constitutional obligation to provide lower income housing and, at the same time, plan the future of the state intelligently."

One Parsippany resident stated, "I'm very frustrated that this significant tract of undeveloped land is being razed for development when so much property in Parsippany lies vacant," said Dave Kaplan, of the Stop the Overdevelopment at Waterview opposition group.

Sierra Club

The New Jersey chapter of the Sierra Club applauded Christie's efforts to reform affordable housing law in 2010:

The current COAH law has had a bigger impact on land use and development than any other law in New Jersey's history. The Sierra Club strongly supports a requirement for affordable housing. As towns grow, they must provide a fair share of it. But the need for affordable housing should not undermine the environmental protections given to wetlands, flood plains, steep slopes, stream buffers that protect water supplies, ocean-fronts, and endangered species habitat. And no homes should be built where water supply is at critically low levels. Furthermore, new housing should be located where jobs are, to reduce the carbon footprints and pollution associated with automobile commuting.

Present-day demands for legislative reform
Some believe the NJ Supreme Court seeks legislative action to implement the Mount Laurel doctrine based on recent rulings, as of mid-2017:

January 2017 NJ Supreme Court decision 
In January 2017, the NJ Supreme Court issued a ruling stating that towns had to consider any historic failure to provide affordable housing.  As one commentator put it,

This case resolved affordable housing regulation debates that have been ongoing since 1999. However, the Court provided no guidance on the method of implementation of affordable housing accommodations that it now requires of municipalities. This decision leaves numerous unanswered questions and it will depend heavily on the Legislature to issue reform of affordable housing requirements. This decision requires implementation of affordable housing accommodations into township plans that have not otherwise considered them since 1999. It is likely that the open spaces in towns will now be filled with affordable housing units, which will bring an influx of population to municipalities. ... We will need to watch the Legislature to see how and if it will alter the current affordable housing regulations to comply with the Court's recent ruling.MaryAnn Spoto, N.J. on the hook for thousands more affordable housing units, Supreme Court says

In its January 2017 opinion, the NJ Supreme Court welcomed the legislature to re-approach the affordable housing issue: "We recognize, as we have before, that the Legislature is not foreclosed from considering alternative methods for calculating and assigning a municipal fair share of affordable housing, and to that end, we welcome legislative attention to this important social and economic constitutional matter," Justice LaVecchia wrote.

Legislator criticism
A Morris County Freeholder candidate,  Harding Committeeman Nicolas Platt, proposed in May 2017 that all mayors state-wide conduct a sit-in in Trenton and refuse to leave the statehouse until legislators acted to reduce the overdevelopment impact of the builder's remedy issue.

Bergen and Passaic County Assemblywoman Holly Schepisi argued in a July 2017 opinion piece that reform was urgently needed: "If built, the number of new homes alone would far exceed all the homes in the entire borough of Manhattan," she stated, calling the issue one of overdevelopment "madness."

In the summer of 2017, Schepisi held the first of several planned public hearing in Paramus with various civic leaders on mandated affordable housing with local mayors and other state assembly members.

"It is long past time for the Legislature to act, and block [the nonprofit group Fair Share Housing Center] from their objective of destroying our suburban communities," said one mayor at the hearing according to the press. "We really need action. Nobody has done what they need to do."

Schepisi stated she invited the Fair Share Housing Center to attend but received a letter declining an appearance.

In Somerset County, Montgomery Township Mayor Ed Trzaska said the influx of apartment complex development would ruin the rural character of the area, "overwhelm the township's infrastructure, greatly increase property taxes and burden the school system and negatively impact the quality of life in the township."

In Union County, in the summer of 2017, the Clark town council issued a unanimous resolution demanding for the state legislature to take action to reform the affordable housing issue; the mayor stated that otherwise, "Union County will look like Queens in 25 years."

In Berkeley Heights in Union County in June 2017, council president Marc Faecher said he considered the legislature's failure to act on overdevelopment to be an "abject failure by our state government."

Public criticism

In June 2018, NJ 101.5 radio host Bill Spadea advocated for a constitutional amendment to revoke the doctrine, arguing the imposition of unnecessary development increased tax burdens unfairly.

Regional town partnership approaches
In the summer of 2017, the mayors of five Bergen County towns announced they were "teaming up to take a regional perspective on affordable housing, in an effort to find reasonable solutions that will protect the integrity of their communities."

Case Study: Chatham, NJ
As of October 2019, no affordable housing units are listed as available in Chatham Township, NJ. In Morris County as a whole, between 2010 and 2014, there were only 39 units of affordable housing for every 100 renters classified as having extremely low income (ELI). This is a 6% decrease in the number of units since 2000. The suburban town has acquired COAH-certified credits associated with previous iterations of the third round of affordable housing, which reduced the town's affordable housing obligation (16). To address the current lack of affordable housing, Chatham Township is in the process of building the third round of affordable housing units in compliance with the Mount Laurel Doctrine. Sterling Sun Homes Developers will be constructing 25 affordable housing  on the 3.6-acre site of the current skate park on Southern Boulevard.

Objections:

	The Chatham Township community has raised several objections to the new affordable housing units consistent historical and regional objections to the Mount Laurel Doctrine. Many citizens have raised concerns about the impact fees that will be imposed on the residents to help fund the new affordable housing units. A Chatham Township resident, speaking at the Township Committee meeting on September 12, 2019, suggested this “punitive fee...can… be passed and simply not implemented”. This suggestion mirrors the open refusal to comply with the Mount Laurel Doctrine I, which requires the municipality to provide housing for people of multiple income brackets, which was common between 1975 and 1981. The Mount Laurel Doctrine requires municipalities to add fair share housing via municipal zoning. Aside from the monetary cost, residents have raised concerns about the loss of open space and trees. This development will require the removal of 18 trees on the skate park property and is slated to exceed the allowed building height in the township by 2.98 feet. The conflict over open space is one that is occurring in many municipalities, such as those in the "Builder’s remedy lawsuit cases". A group of teens raised concerns about the loss of the community's skate park, for which there are no current plans to rebuild. As this area is suburban, a resident said “I’m not averse to affordable housing in itself,” but he is “averse to is an expanded population” as the town is characterized by low-density housing. Another resident noted that the location of the development is in a high traffic area near the elementary school, and the new residents will lead to reduced parking and pedestrian safety. Concerns about the changing suburban form come up frequently in "legislator outcry" in connection to concerns that New Jersey suburban communities will begin to look like cities.

New Jersey mayors have traditionally opposed affordable housing. The stance of town leadership on fair land use policies is unclear as the public has been excluded from many of these discussions surrounding inclusionary inclusionary zoning via the Open Public Records Act (N.J.S.A 10:4-12 ) are taking place in executive session, rather than the public session.

Vacant and abandoned properties

Some have argued that the deluge of abandoned and vacant properties in New Jersey should be taken into account before forced building occurs in less crowded areas.  They have also suggested that the state step up funding for code enforcement to reduce burdens of urban blight on attractive home development, including enforcement on absentee landlords.  The City of Newark is "working with the Urban League to identify vacant or abandoned properties that can be sold to small developers to then sell at cost to residents. About 16 percent of Newark's housing is vacant and the city has a high eviction and foreclosure rate according to a Rutgers report.

See also
Abbott district, a similarly controversial legal doctrine resulting from a series of New Jersey Supreme Court cases holding that the education of children in poor communities was unconstitutionally inadequate.
Frederick Wilson Hall, who wrote the initial decision
 Latino Action Network v. New Jersey, a lawsuit filed in 2018 to desegregate the public schools.

References

External links 

Rutgers School of Law-Newark's Mount Laurel Archive
https://web.archive.org/web/20071027212202/http://www.politicsnj.com/mchose-says-fair-housing-bill-misses-mark-doesnt-address-why-housing-unaffordable-new-jersey-9290
https://web.archive.org/web/20061212124727/http://www.huduser.org/publications/fairhsg/lending.html

Affordable housing
New Jersey law
Mount Laurel, New Jersey
Zoning in the United States
Real property law in the United States
Supreme Court of New Jersey
Legal doctrines and principles
Law articles needing an infobox